Philippe Caubère (born September 21, 1950 in Marseille, France) is a noted French film actor, writer and producer.

He is known for his memorable performances as Molière in the 1978 French movie and the TV series as well. His other movies include La gloire de mon père (My Father's Glory) and Le Château de ma mère (My Mother's Castle), and more recently Aragon, La triomphe de la jalousie and La fête de l'amour.

Selected filmography

External links
 

1950 births
Living people
Male actors from Marseille
French male television actors
French male film actors